Harry Munroe Napier Hetherington Irving (19 November 1905 in Oxford – 20 June 1993 in Cape Town), often cited as H. M. N. H. Irving, was a British chemist.

Education
As a student as The Queen's College, Oxford, Irving received a BA in 1928 and a DPhil in 1930, the same year he received his Licentiate of the Royal Academy of Music. In 1954, he was awarded a DSc.

Career
Irving was a lecturer and demonstrator in chemistry at Oxford University from 1930 to 1961. He was also the Vice Principal of St Edmund Hall.

During the 1940s he began research into coordination chemistry. In 1953, Irving and his doctoral student Robert Williams described a periodic trend now known as the Irving–Williams Series. 

Irving was Professor of Inorganic and Structural Chemistry at the University of Leeds between 1961 and 1971 and Professor of Analytical Science at the University of Cape Town between 1979 and 1985.

Private life
Irving was a Freemason under the United Grand Lodge of England. Initiated in the Churchill Lodge No 478 (Oxford), he later joined the Apollo University Lodge No 357 (Oxford), to which he was proposed by fellow Oxford scientist Bertram Maurice Hobby. Irving served at different times as Worshipful Master of both lodges.

Books authored
H. M. N. H. Irving, H. Freiser and T. S. West, Compendium of analytical nomenclature : definitive rules, Pergamon Press 1977 
H. M. N. H. Irving, The Techniques of Analytical Chemistry: Short Historical Survey, Science Museum 1974
H. M. N. H. Irving, Dithizone, Royal Society of Chemistry, 1977

External links 
 Irving-Williams Series - Transition Metal Chemistry

References

1905 births
1993 deaths
English chemists
Fellows of the Royal Society of Chemistry
Fellows of the Royal Society of South Africa
Alumni of The Queen's College, Oxford
Alumni of the Royal Academy of Music
Fellows of St Edmund Hall, Oxford
Academics of the University of Leeds
Academic staff of the University of Cape Town
British expatriates in South Africa
Freemasons of the United Grand Lodge of England